Caramel is a sweet food.

Caramel may also refer to:

Caramel color, a food coloring
Caramel (film), a 2007 film directed by Nadine Labaki
"Caramel" (Suzanne Vega song), a 1996 song by Suzanne Vega
"Caramel" (Blur song), a 1999 song by Blur
"Caramel" (City High song), a 2001 song by City High
"Caramel", a 2012 song by Booba
”Caramel” a 2022 song by 5 Seconds Of Summer from 5SOS5
"Caramel", a 2016 song by Corinne Bailey Rae from the album The Heart Speaks in Whispers
Caramel (album), a 2013 album by New Zealand psychedelic pop musician Connan Mockasin
Caramel Pictures, a film company producing commercials
Ferenc Molnár, popularly known as Caramel, Hungarian singer.

See also
Caramell, a Swedish musical group
Carmel (disambiguation)